Jerry Holman is an American former professional basketball center. Jerry attended Humboldt High School. Holman played collegiately at the University of Minnesota, graduating in 2003.  He played for minor American professional leagues, with the Kansas City Knights and Pennsylvania ValleyDawgs before moving to Turkey.  Holman spent the 2005–06 season with Pınar Karşıyaka and the 2006–07 season with Galatasaray Café Crown.

References

External links
Professional profile

Living people
Minnesota Golden Gophers men's basketball players
Centers (basketball)
Karşıyaka basketball players
Galatasaray S.K. (men's basketball) players
American men's basketball players
Year of birth missing (living people)